Rich Braham (born November 6, 1970) is a former National Football League center who played for the Cincinnati Bengals. Rich now lives in Morgantown West Virginia. He has 3 kids. 2 of which are twins, Rylee and Luke.

High school career
Braham attended University High School in Morgantown, West Virginia, where he lettered in both football and basketball. He won second-team prep All-State honors as a senior in basketball.

College career
Braham attended West Virginia University, where, as a senior, he was a second-team All-American, an All-Big East selection, and helped lead the team to a Sugar Bowl berth and an 11 win-1 loss record.

NFL career
Braham was drafted by the Phoenix Cardinals in the 1994 NFL Draft, but then was waived where he was picked up by the Cincinnati Bengals. He played with the Bengals for 13 seasons. At the end of the 2006 NFL season, Braham decided to announce his retirement after sustaining a knee injury during the week 2 game against the Cleveland Browns.

1970 births
American football centers
Cincinnati Bengals players
Living people
Sportspeople from Morgantown, West Virginia
Players of American football from West Virginia
University High School (Morgantown, West Virginia) alumni
West Virginia Mountaineers football players
Ed Block Courage Award recipients